Manolis K. Kefalogiannis (born 25 May 1959) is a Greek politician of the New Democracy party from Heraklion, Crete, who has been serving as a Member of the European Parliament since 2014.

Political career

Member of the Greek Parliament, 1990–2014
Kefalogiannis served as a member of the Hellenic Parliament from 1990 until 2014. From 2004 to 2007 he was Minister for Mercantile Marine in the government of Prime Minister Kostas Karamanlis. In the 15th legislature from 2012 until 2014, he was a member of the Special Permanent Committee on Institutions and Transparency.

Member of the European Parliament, 2014–present
In the 2014 European elections, Kefalogiannis became a Member of the European Parliament. In parliament, he first served on the Committee on Foreign Affairs and its Subcommittee on Security and Defence from 2014 until 2019 before moving to the Committee on Regional Development. In this capacity, he served as the parliament’s rapporteur on the Just Transition Fund (JTF), a 17.5 billion euro ($21.37 billion) fund established as part of the European Green Deal in 2021 to support communities most affected by plans to shut down coal, peat and oil shale sectors, or other emissions-intensive industries.

In addition to his committee assignments, Kefalogiannis is part of the parliament's delegations to the EU-Turkey Joint Parliamentary Committee and to the EU-Albania Stabilisation and Association Parliamentary Committee. He is also a member of the European Parliament Intergroup on Artificial Intelligence and Digital, the URBAN Intergroup and the Spinelli Group.

Personal life
Kefalogiannis is the nephew of fellow politician Manolis V. Kefalogiannis.

References

External links
Biography on Greek Parliament website
 

1959 births
Living people
Politicians from Heraklion
Greek MPs 1990–1993
Greek MPs 1993–1996
Greek MPs 1996–2000
Greek MPs 2000–2004
Greek MPs 2004–2007
Greek MPs 2007–2009
Greek MPs 2009–2012
Greek MPs 2012 (May)
Greek MPs 2012–2014
New Democracy (Greece) MEPs
MEPs for Greece 2014–2019
Ministers for Mercantile Marine of Greece
MEPs for Greece 2019–2024